Clario is a security software development company that offers consumer-facing digital security and privacy applications for use on a range of operating systems including iOS, Android, macOS.

Clario Tech allegedly has more than 800 team members in various worldwide locations, the majority appear to be operating from Ukraine. The workforce consists of software developers, marketing specialists, security researchers and customer support agents. In 2019, the company announced it would invest $30 million during 2020 to develop its cybersecurity products and make them accessible for all.

Products

Clario 
Clario security application was officially launched at the Consumer Electronic Awards in January 2020 in Las Vegas. Clario announced its aim was to offer a new online security product via a user-friendly dashboard, integrating cybersecurity technology with 24/7 human support against digital threats.

The cybersecurity application has been reviewed in various publications including the Evening Standard who called it the “Uber of cybersecurity”.

In response to the COVID-19 pandemic, Clario launched a 24/7 IT support hotline for anyone to call if they experienced technology issues while in lockdown. The company’s 600+ team were on hand to respond to any reported issues.

Clario received the AV-TEST certification in December 2020 and was featured in the honorable mentions list in the Privacy Focused tool nomination as part of the Product Hunt’s 2020 Golden Kitty Award Winners in 2020.

MacUpdate 
MacUpdate is a Macintosh software download website founded in 1997 by Joel Mueller. In 2017, the site was sold to Zeobit, and subsequently was acquired by Clario Tech in 2020.

MacKeeper 
MacKeeper is utility software that offers system cleaning, privacy features and antivirus for macOS. Clario Tech has become the owner of the MacKeeper software since 2019 with aim to accelerate the transformation of MacKeeper.

Clario cybersecurity research 
Clario Tech has undertaken numerous pieces of research into cybersecurity trends in 2020 and 2021. These include "Which Company Uses the Most of Your Data?", "The State of Cybercrime in US and UK", "Cybercrime Hotspots".

References 

Antivirus software
Security software